Elisabeth Kendall is a British Arabist, academic and commentator whose scholarship has ranged from Middle Eastern literatures to militant jihad. She is best known for her work on how Islamist extremists exploit Arabic cultures and traditions.

Biography
She attended Beaconsfield High School before reading Oriental Studies at the University of Oxford where she gained a first-class degree and was awarded the Schacht Memorial Prize. She secured her first lectureship at Pembroke College, Oxford. She was awarded a Kennedy Scholarship to pursue her doctoral research at Harvard University.

From 2000 to 2010, she held positions at St Antony's College, Oxford then the University of Edinburgh, where she was appointed Director of the Centre for the Advanced Study of the Arab World (CASAW). Since 2010, she has been Senior Research Fellow in Arabic and Islamic Studies at Pembroke College, University of Oxford. She spends significant time in the field, particularly in Yemen.

Kendall edits the "Essential Middle Eastern Vocabularies" series, for which she also authored three volumes: Diplomacy Arabic, Intelligence Arabic and Media Arabic. Kendall appears frequently in the international television, radio and print media. She has been invited to present her research to governments, military and intelligence audiences all around the world.

On 7 March 2022 it was announced that she would become Mistress of Girton College, Cambridge with effect from 1 October 2022.

Publications 

 Diplomacy Arabic, coauthored with Yehia A. Mohamed, Edinburgh University Press, 2020
 Reclaiming Islamic Tradition: Modern Interpretations of the Classical Heritage, collection of articles co-edited with Ahmad Khan, Edinburgh University Press, 2016.
 Twenty-First Century Jihad: Law, Society and Military Action (series: Library of Modern Religion), collection of articles co-edited with Ewan Stein, I.B.Tauris, 2015.
 Literature, Journalism and the Avant-Garde: Intersection in Egypt (series: Routledge Studies in Middle Eastern Literatures), Routledge, 2006.

References 

Year of birth missing (living people)
Living people
British Arabists
Alumni of Pembroke College, Oxford
Women orientalists